, often referred to as , was founded in 1728 as the first marine insurance company in Denmark. It held a monopoly on marine insurance  in Denmark until 1786.

History
Det Kongelige octroierede Søe-Assurance Compagni was founded in the Børsen building in Copenhagen in 1728. Its monopoly was finally lifted in 1783, leading to the formal establishment of De private Assurandeurer in 1786. The company existed until 1930.

References

Financial services companies established in 1728 
Insurance companies of Denmark
Danish companies established in 1728
1930 disestablishments in Denmark